is a railway station on the Jōetsu Line in the city of Minamiuonuma, Niigata, Japan, operated by the East Japan Railway Company (JR East).

Lines

Station layout
The station has  a two ground-level opposed side platforms connected by a footbridge. The station is unattended.

Platforms

History
Ōsawa Station opened on 28 May 1949. Upon the privatization of the Japanese National Railways (JNR) on 1 April 1987, it came under the control of JR East.

Surrounding area
Joetsu International Ski Resort
Osawayama Onsen

See also
 List of railway stations in Japan

External links
  Ōsawa Station information (JR East) 

Railway stations in Niigata Prefecture
Railway stations in Japan opened in 1949
Stations of East Japan Railway Company
Jōetsu Line
Minamiuonuma